Pan (1895–1915) was a Berlin-based German arts magazine, published by the PAN co-operative of artists, poets and critics.  Focused on literature, theatre and music, the magazine published more than 20 issues "without reference to commercial, moral, personal or polemical questions, appreciating only the purely aesthetic viewpoint.” The magazine's mission was democratic in its commitment to Gesamtkunstwerk ("synthesized artwork"), and providing support to young artists of all kinds. To that end, the magazine sold tiered subscriptions: standard and luxury, and quickly "became the most expensive German art magazine of its era.  Its artists-first commitment also led to its becoming one of the best representations of pan-European art in the early days of Abstract and Expressionist art.

History

Co-founded by Richard Dehmel and published from 1895 to 1900 in Berlin by Otto Julius Bierbaum and Julius Meier-Graefe, the group only ended up publishing three issues. 

In 1910, the magazine was revived by Berlin gallery owner and art dealer Paul Cassirer who went on to publish contributors like Frank Wedekind, Georg Heym, Ernst Barlach and Franz Marc with his Pan-Presse imprint. Cassirer's avant-garde taste in print reflected his gallery work. He was the first to exhibit Manet, Cezanne, Van Gogh and Gauguin in Germany, and he championed the work of the Impressionists' German counterparts, also showing Lovis Corinth, Max Liebermann and Lesser Ury. 

This group, along with Barlach, Kandinsky, and Beckmann eventually made up the core of the Berlin Secession, artists who rejected traditional art styles then advanced by both academia and officials, and created the foundation of Modernism. 

In 1912, Alfred Kerr took over the publication of the magazine, and it appeared only sporadically until its demise in 1915.

An influential arbiter of culture, Pan printed stories and poems, in the emerging Symbolist and Naturalist movements, by authors such as Otto Julius Bierbaum, Max Dauthendey, Richard Dehmel and Arno Holz. It also played an important role in the development of German Art Nouveau, by cultivating a stable of both well-known and unknown artists, including Franz von Stuck, Félix Vallotton, and Thomas Theodor Heine.

See also
 Bauhaus
 Gesamtkunstwerk
 List of magazines in Germany
 Jugend magazine
 Secession (art)
 Simplicissimus (magazine)

References

External links

Digital Versions
 Pan at University Library Heidelberg
 Pan at Princeton's Blue Mountain Project

1895 establishments in Germany
1915 establishments in Germany
Pan
Defunct literary magazines published in Germany
German-language magazines
Magazines established in 1895
Magazines disestablished in 1915
Magazines published in Berlin
Visual arts magazines published in Germany